Rio Branco Atlético Clube, or Rio Branco, as they are usually called, is a Brazilian football team from Vitória in Espírito Santo, founded on June 21, 1913.

Rio Branco is the top ranked team from Espírito Santo in CBF's national club ranking, being placed 114th overall.

History
The club was founded in 1913 and its history is confused with the history of many other clubs created in the early years of the twentieth century.

According to Antonio Miguez, one of the founders of Rio Branco, in an interview with journalist Oscar Gomes Filho, author of the most important work ever published on a soccer club in Espírito Santo - Rio Branco Atlético Clube - Stories and Conquests (1913-1987), The story of Rio Branco begins in May 1913. From the "peeled" and "cracks" in fields of discovered areas, the boys of Sul América and the XV de Novembro (teams linked to traditional teaching institutions of the Season, State College and Normal School) already had fun with football and the two other teams were already thinking about competitions, Rui Barbosa (who had a short life) and the Victoria Foot-Ball Club, founded by rich white boys.

But the poor also liked "gusts." Among them, José Batista Pavão and Antônio Miguez, until then clerks in a hardware store. The two, in one of the many conversations about soccer, together with Edmundo Martins, also a clerk, decided to found a team. On the second Sunday of June they held a new meeting and brought several guests. The first to accept the invitation was Nestor Ferreira Lima, who despite studying at the State College, did not play in Sul América. The boys present, all between 14 and 16 years old, exchanged ideas and discussed everything from the English ball to the caps. New meeting was scheduled, this time for the founding of the club. The meeting was scheduled for June 21, 1913 and guests should bring a name suggestion to the new club.

On that day, everyone presented with their best clothes. The suggestions of names were varied, from names of personalities of the history of Brazil and commemorative dates. Also several suggestions of names of Portuguese heroes, but the most popular already gave names to clubs existing in Vitória (Saldanha of Gama and Álvares Cabral).

The alternatives became scarcer, when one of the young people, whom Antônio Miguez does not remember, suggested a tribute to the young people who idealized him, young and vigorous. The "Juventude e Vigor" was born.
 
The important meeting took place at Nestor Ferreira Filho's house, more precisely in a room furnished by his father, next to his accounting office. The founders have entered into the history of the club: Edmundo Martins, Antônio Miguez, Gervázio Pimentel, José Fiel, José Batista Pavão, Cláudio Daumas, Otávio Alves de Araújo, Hermenegildo Conde, Adriano Macedo, Antônio Gonçalves de Souza and Nestor Ferreira Filho, who would be its first president.

Shortly after its founding, some of its founders, invited by young people from 14 to 16 years old, did not feel well with the denomination, since they were not teenagers anymore and they remembered that the other founders also would not be them. During this period, Juventude e Vigor also 'matured', with the support of Rui Barbosa's players. The decision, at a meeting held on February 10, 1914, was swift and affirmed with reference to the events that marked the republican history of that time: to honor the Chancellor José Maria da Silva Paranhos Júnior, known as the Baron of Rio Branco. The name "Youth and Vigor" came out of the scene and the Rio Branco Football Club appeared.

On March 8, 1941, Mr. Luiz Gabeira, who had been President in 1930, was elected as President of the club. Once the legal requirements to operate for a short time like Riobranquinho were restored, administrative normality was restored and the team was victorious, as was the case Since its foundation, the alvinegros leaders held a General Assembly on March 18, 1941, to deliberate on the creation of a new association. Having as motto the phrase "All for the benefit of Rio Branco", created the Rio Branco Atlético Clube. From that moment, the club would have, in the shield, the acronym RBAC, of memorable conquests.

Current squad

Stadium

Rio Branco play their home games at Estádio Kléber Andrade. The stadium has a maximum capacity of 21,152 people.

Rivalries
The biggest rival is Desportiva Ferroviária, which both make the state's largest derby known as the Giants Classic. Another rival is Vitória Futebol Clube, with whom he has been doing the Vi-Rio classic since 1913.

Honours
 Campeonato Capixaba: 37
1918, 1919, 1921, 1924, 1929, 1930, 1934, 1935, 1936, 1937, 1938, 1939, 1941, 1942, 1945, 1946, 1947, 1949, 1951, 1957, 1958, 1959, 1962, 1963, 1966, 1968, 1969, 1970, 1971, 1973, 1975, 1978, 1982, 1983, 1985, 2010, 2015

 Copa Espírito Santo: 1
2016

 Campeonato Capixaba Second Division: 2
2005, 2018

References

External links
 Official Site

 
Association football clubs established in 1913
Football clubs in Espírito Santo
Vitória, Espírito Santo
1913 establishments in Brazil